The Auxiliary Medical Service Cadet Corps (Cantonese: 醫療輔助隊少年團) is a part of the Auxiliary Medical Service of Hong Kong, for young people aged 12–18 years.

History
According to section 21 of Chapter 517 of the Laws of Hong Kong, amended 1999, the Chief Executive may recruit and maintain a youth group known as the Auxiliary Medical Service Cadet Corps, for persons aged over 12 and under 18.

In 2011, the AMSCC was established, receiving a total of 2,200 applications. After a two-round interview, 403 were selected to join the AMSCC, including 235 girls and 168 boys.

References 
 Citations

Medical and health organisations based in Hong Kong
Youth organisations based in Hong Kong
2011 establishments in Hong Kong